The year 1998 is the fourth year in the history of Fighting Network Rings, a mixed martial arts promotion based in Japan. In 1998 Fighting Network Rings held nine events beginning with, Rings: Battle Dimensions Tournament 1997 Final.

Title fights

Events list

Rings: Battle Dimensions Tournament 1997 Final

Rings: Battle Dimensions Tournament 1997 Final was an event held on January 21, 1998.

Results

Rings Holland: The King of Rings

Rings Holland: The King of Rings was an event held on February 8, 1998 at Sporthallen Zuid in Amsterdam, North Holland, Netherlands.

Results

Rings Russia: Russia vs. Holland

Rings Russia: Russia vs. Holland was an event held on April 25, 1998 in Yekaterinburg, Russia.

Results

Rings: Third Fighting Integration

Rings: Third Fighting Integration was an event held on May 29, 1998 in Tokyo, Japan.

Results

Rings Holland: Who's the Boss

Rings Holland: Who's the Boss was an event held on June 7, 1998 at Vechtsebanen Sport Hall in Utrecht, Netherlands.

Results

Rings: Fourth Fighting Integration

Rings: Fourth Fighting Integration was an event held on June 27, 1998 in Tokyo, Japan.

Results

Rings Australia: NR2

Rings Australia: NR2 was an event held on September 13, 1998 in Australia.

Results

Rings Holland: The Thialf Explosion

Rings Holland: The Thialf Explosion was an event held on October 24, 1998 at Thialf Stadion in Heerenveen in Friesland, the Netherlands.

Results

Rings: World Mega Battle Tournament

Rings: World Mega Battle Tournament was an event held on December 23, 1998 in Japan.

Results

See also 
 Fighting Network Rings
 List of Fighting Network Rings events

References

Fighting Network Rings events
1998 in mixed martial arts